The Shelley Collection is a collection of philatelic material relating to the Spanish Civil War that forms part of the British Library Philatelic Collections.

The collection is in five volumes and mainly comprises covers used to and from the International Brigades. It was formed by Ronald G. Shelley and bequeathed to the library in 2003.

See also
Bailey Collection
Blackburn Collection
Postage stamps and postal history of Spain

References

Further reading 
Shelley, Ronald G. The postal history of the Spanish Civil War, 1936-1939. Brighton: R.G. Shelley, 1967.

External links

Spanish Postal History Resources

British Library Philatelic Collections
Philately of Spain